Taddei's serotine (Eptesicus taddeii) is a species of medium-sized bat belonging to the family Vespertilionidae. It is restricted to the Atlantic Forest of southern Brazil.

The specific name honours the Brazilian zoologist Valdir Antônio Taddei.

References

Eptesicus
Mammals described in 2006
Bats of Brazil